The Real Marigold Hotel (known in Australia as The Indian Dream Hotel) is a British travel documentary series created by Twofour productions, directed by Aparna Sanyal and broadcast on BBC One and BBC Two. The show, whose name is based on the film The Best Exotic Marigold Hotel follows elderly celebrities as they travel around India and experience the culture. In 2017, the show was nominated for a BAFTA in the category of Best Reality and Constructed Factual.

Episodes

The Real Marigold Hotel

The Real Marigold on Tour

Reception
First aired on BBC Two, the series was described as heart-warming by The Independent and credited by The Daily Telegraph as exposing the contrasting perceptions of ageism in India and the United Kingdom. The Radio Times called it funny and charming. The show was nominated for a BAFTA award for Best Reality and Constructed Factual. The first series was the highest rating factual series on BBC Two in 2016 with an average of 4.1 million and a 13.6 percent share. It was also awarded a prestigious Rose d’Or Award for Reality and Factual Entertainment, a Grierson Award for Constructed Documentary Series, and a Broadcast Award for Popular Factual programme.

After the popularity of the first series, the show's second series was moved to BBC One where it continued to receive mostly positive reviews despite a different cast of celebrities. After the series ended, a new series named The Real Marigold on Tour was commissioned which saw celebrities travel to Florida and Japan. A second series was also produced which was broadcast at the end of 2017 with celebrities visiting China, Cuba, Iceland and Thailand.

See also
 Arvind Singh Mewar

References

External links
 
 

BBC high definition shows
2016 British television series debuts
Television shows set in Rajasthan
2010s British travel television series
2010s British documentary television series
2020s British travel television series
2020s British documentary television series
BBC travel television series
Television series by ITV Studios
English-language television shows
Television shows set in Kerala
Television shows set in Jaipur
Television shows set in India
Television episodes set in Florida
Television episodes set in Japan
Television episodes set in China
Television episodes set in Iceland
Television episodes set in Thailand
Television episodes set in Russia
Television episodes set in Buenos Aires
Television episodes set in Vietnam
Television episodes set in Mexico